Mats Eilertsen (born 4 March 1975) is a Norwegian jazz musician and composer. He is known for recording with numerous bands, including the Maria Kannegaard Trio, Ola Kvernberg, Nils Økland, Eldbjørg Raknes, Anders Aarum Trio, Eirik Hegdal, Sverre Gjørvad, Nymark Collective, SKRUK, «Jazzmob», «Dingobats», Håkon Kornstad Trio, Food with Iain Ballamy, Jacob Young Band, Solveig Slettahjell's Slow Motion Orchestra, Håvard Wiik Trio, and «JazzCode».

Career
Eilertsen was born in Trondheim and attended the Trondheim Musikkonservatorium, where he participated in the Jazz program and was part of the Jazz band Dingobats along with fellow students Eirik Hegdal (saxophones), Njål Ølnes (tenor saxophone), Thomas Dahl (guitar) and Sverre Gjørvad (drums), primarily playing Hegdals compositions. He has two band releases as leader of the band Turanga, with band members Fredrik Ljungkvist, Ernst Reijseger, and Thomas Strønen. He also performed with the quartet «Parish», with some of the same members as of «Turanga». In 2006, he released the album Constellations (Jazzaway Records), with the Finnish pianist Alexi Tuomarila's trio, along with Olavi Luohivuori.

Honors 
2002: Kongsberg Jazz Award, within Håkon Kornstad Trio

Discography

Solo albums 
2005: Turanga (Aim Records),  with Turanga (voted this year's release of the Japanese jazz magazine Music Magazine)
2006: Flux (Aim Records),  with Turanga
2009: Radio Yonder (Hubro Music), with Tore Brunborg, Olavi Louhivuori, and Thomas T. Dahl
2016: Rubicon (ECM Records), with Eirik Hegdal, Thomas T Dahl, Trygve Seim, Harmen Fraanje, and Olavi Louhivuori (commission for the 2014 Vossajazz)
2019: Reveries and Revelations (Hubro Music), with Thomas Strønen Arve Henriksen Eivind Aarset Geir Sundstøl and Per Oddvar Johansen
2021: Hymn for Hope (Hemli), with Thomas Dahl: guitar; Tore Brunborg: saxophone; Hans Hulbækmo: drums

SkyDive Trio
2011: SkyDive (Hubro Music)
2015: Sun Moee (Hubro Music)

Mats Eilertsen Trio including with Harmen Fraanje and Thomas Strønen
2013: Sails Set (Hubro Music)
2019: And Then Comes the Night (ECM)

Collaborations 
Within Dingobats
1998: The New Dingobats Generation
2002: Pöck (Bergland Productions), which featured Live Maria Roggen (vocals)
2004: Follow (Jazzaway Records)

Within Food (Iain Ballamy, Arve Henriksen & Thomas Strønen)
2000: Food (Feral Records)
2001: Organic and GM Food (Feral Records)
2002: Veggie (Rune Grammofon)
2004: Last Supper (Rune Grammofon)

Within Håvard Wiik Trio
2003: Postures (Jazzland Acoustic)

With Jacob Young
2004: Evening Falls (ECM)
2008: Sideways (ECM)

 Alexi Tuomarila Trio (Olavi Louhivuori)
 2006: Constellation (Jazzaway - JARCD 030)
 2013:  Seven Hills (Edition Records - EDN1041)
 2017:  Kingdom (Edition Records - EDN1090)

Within Tord Gustavsen Ensemble/Quartet
2009: Restored, Returned (ECM Records)
2012: The Well (ECM Records)
2014: Extended Circle (ECM Records)

With Yelena Eckemoff
2012: Forget-me-not (L & H Production)

Compilation projects
2007: Short Stories (Aim Records) with Frode Haltli and Torbjørn Dyrud
2010: Elegy (Hubro) with Harmen Fraanje and Thomas Strønen

References

External links 
 
 Mats Eilertsen SkyDive Quartet - The Void on YouTube
 Mats Eilertsen SkyDive Trio on SoundCloud

1975 births
Living people
Norwegian University of Science and Technology alumni
Hubro Music artists
Rune Grammofon artists
ECM Records artists
Norwegian jazz upright-bassists
Male double-bassists
Norwegian jazz drummers
Male drummers
Norwegian musicians
Scandinavian musicians
Norwegian male bass guitarists
Norwegian jazz composers
Male jazz composers
Musicians from Trondheim
21st-century Norwegian drummers
21st-century double-bassists
21st-century Norwegian bass guitarists
21st-century Norwegian male musicians
Ensemble Denada members
Jacob Young Group members
Dingobats members
Maria Kannegaard Trio members
The Source (band) members
Tord Gustavsen Ensemble members
Jazzaway Records artists